The 18th Infantry Division (18. Dywizja Piechoty) was a division of the Polish Armed Forces. The division was originally part of  Polish Army during the interbellum period, which took part in the Polish September Campaign. Stationed in Łomża and commanded in 1939 by Colonel Stefan Kossecki, it was part of the Narew Independent Operational Group.

The division was re-established in its modern form in September 2018 and renamed to the 18th Mechanized Division as part of an expansion of the Polish Army, partially as a result of heightened security threats to Poland. The division will have achieved initial operating capacity by the end of 2019, with further strengthening of the formation to be completed by the mid-2020s.

History
It was formed in 1919 from the units of the Blue Army.

Interwar 
Between 1919 and 1939, Łomża and neighboring towns were located very close to the border of Poland and German province of East Prussia. Defense of this area was regarded as crucial in any future conflict, so 18th Division was regarded as an elite unit. More than 50% of its soldiers were local conscripts from northern Mazovia and Podlasie, whose patriotism was highly appreciated.

Invasion of Poland 
The Division assembled on August 30, 1939, and the next day it occupied defense positions along the Narew river. Until September 3, it had a limited contact with the Wehrmacht. It was then ordered to take positions previously held by the Polish 41st Infantry Division. On September 7, it left Ostrołęka and was ordered to halt the advance of German 21st Infantry Division near Nowogrod. The efforts of Polish soldiers were mixed, but on the night of Sept 9-10, it attacked a German armored column, destroying several vehicles and tanks.

During the next days the Division was engaged in heavy fights with units of General Heinz Guderian's XIX Army Corps. After several bloody skirmishes, the Germans severely wounded Colonel Kossecki. Twenty volunteers, who wanted to take his body from the battleground, were killed by a German machine gun. Kossecki himself survived, but was captured by the Soviets and probably killed by them in the Katyn massacre. The division effectively ceased to exist.

In the night of September 13–14 the Germans massacred 200 Polish POWs, gathered in the courtyard in the barracks in Zambrów (the Zambrów massacre).

21st century 
The reactivation of the Division was announced by the Polish Ministry of Defence in September 2018 as part of the effort to expand and modernize the Polish Army amidst heightened tension with Russia. Initially, the division will be two brigades strong, with the already formed 1st Warsaw Armoured Brigade and the 21st Podhale Rifles (Mountain) Brigade making up its strength. The division will be further strengthened by the creation of a new brigade, the 19th Mechanized Brigade, which is in the process of being formed as of 2019.

Structure of the 18th Mechanized Division

The 18th Mechanised Division (nicknamed The Iron Division) is headquartered in Siedlce and is organised as follows:

 18th Staff Battalion in Siedlce
 1st Warsaw Armoured Brigade "Tadeusz Kościuszko" in Wesoła
 19th Lublin Mechanized Brigade "Franciszek Kleeberg" in Lublin
 21st Podhale Rifles Brigade "Brig. Gen. Mieczysław Boruta-Spiechowicz" in Rzeszów
 18th Logistic Regiment in Łomża

See also
 Polish army order of battle in 1939
 Polish contribution to World War II
 List of Polish divisions in World War II

References

Infantry divisions of Poland
Military units and formations established in 1919
Infantry divisions of Poland in World War II
Military units and formations disestablished in 1939